Arben Allkanjari lkanjari (born 20 November 1989) is an Albanian football player who plays as a striker. He formerly played for Lushnja.

Club career

Lushnja
On 24 October 2015, Allkanjari scored his first league goal of the season as well as the lone goal against Pogradeci, giving his team three important points. On 16 July 2017, after collecting 58 appearances and scoring 6 goals, Allkanjari left Lushnja after his contract expired, becoming a free agent in the process.

FK Dinamo Tirana 
Arbër Allkanjar   was playing for Arbër FK Dinamo Tirana from 01/2013 - 08/2014

References

External links

1989 births
Living people
Sportspeople from Lushnjë
Association football forwards
Albanian footballers
KS Egnatia Rrogozhinë players
FK Dinamo Tirana players
KS Lushnja players
Kategoria e Parë players